In the 1980s the French Thomson company produced a range of 8-bit computers based on the 6809E CPU.
They were released in several variations (mostly concerning the keyboard or color of the casing) covering the MO and TO series from late 1982 to 1989.
While MO and TO models are incompatible in software, most of the peripherals and hardware were compatible.

These machines were common in France due to the 1980s governmental educational program Computing for All (Informatique pour Tous). Around 100,000 MO5 and TO7/70 computers were ordered and installed in schools. 
Export attempts to Germany, Italy, Algeria, USSR, India, Argentina and Spain were unsuccessful. 

It is reported that there were 450,000 Thomson computers in France in 1986. By 1988 Thomson had only sold 60,000 of the predicted 150,000 computers, abandoning computer development the following year.

About 84 games were released for the TO7, 194 for the MO5, 3 for the TO7/70, 10 for the TO9, 21 for the MO6,  and 128 for the TO8. Most titles were released between 1984 and 1987 and by French companies such as Infogrames, Loriciel, FIL or Coktel Vision.

First generation
Thomson TO7: produced from 1982 to 1984. Supplied with 24K RAM (16K used by the video) and upgradable to 48K. 8 color display.
Thomson MO5: released in 1984 in order to honor the Computing for All (Informatique pour Tous) plan. Supplied with 48K RAM (32K available to user in BASIC 1.0) and first released with a rubber keyboard. Later it featured a mechanical keyboard. It was edited in a limited edition with a white casing, named "MO5 Michel Platini".
Thomson TO7/70: 1984 version with more RAM (64K, upgradable into 128K) and 16 color display.
Thomson MO5E: 1985 export version, with a different casing featuring a mechanical keyboard, a parallel port, two joystick ports, an internal PAL modulator and an integrated power supply.

Second generation

Thomson TO9 : released in late 1985. Separate keyboard and central unit, 128K RAM and a 3½-inch floppy disk drive.
Thomson MO5NR: released in 1985-1986. This is a MO6 in a MO5E casing, with an integrated network interface controller, the nanoréseau (nano network), which was used in French schools.
Thomson TO16 (prototype) called Theodore (TO d'or): 5 prototypes developed in 1985-1988.  Based on a MC-68000 at 8 MHz and a rather good graphic card.
Thomson MO6 : released in 1986. 128K RAM and built in tape recorder. Sold in Italy as the Olivetti Prodest PC128.
Thomson TO8 : released in late 1986. 256K RAM, 80K ROM with Microsoft BASIC 512, extra video modes.
Thomson TO9+ : released in late 1986, Separate keyboard and central unit, 512K RAM with a built in modem and a 3½-inch floppy disk drive.
Thomson TO8D : released in late 1987, it was a TO8 with a 3½-inch floppy disk drive.

Unix systems 

 Micromega 32: released in 1982, it was a Motorola 68000-based machine running Version 7 Unix, based on the Fortune 32:16, developed by Fortune Systems Corp.
 Micromega 32000:  A 1986 Alcatel branded machine with a tower layout, supporting Unix SV. The CPU is a 68020 at 16.5 MHz (68881 optional) with 1 to 4 MB of RAM. It features a 70MB hard drive, supports QIC-24 cartridges and offers Arcnet network connection.
 Micromega PC: a 1986 workstation supporting Unix and MS-DOS, and developed based on the PC 7000 XP.
 Micromega SX and Micromega SX/T - These machines have a similar box but with a different floppy drive location. The CPU is a 68000 at 11 MHz and RAM is expandable to 2 MB. It supports 45 and 70 MB hard drives and QIC-11 cartridges on the SX/T.

PC compatible

Micromega 16: released in 1983, it was an IBM PC compatible machine, similar to the Eagle PC developed in 1982 by Columbia Data Products. 
Thomson TO16 : released in September 1987. Intel 8088 based IBM compatible PC.

See also
 Microsoft BASIC 1.0 - A version of BASIC used on Thomson computers
 Thomson EF936x - graphic chip used on Thomson computers
 Computing for All, a French government plan to introduce computers to the country's pupils

References

External links
 Theodore, multi-platform Thomson 8-bit emulator

Lists of computer hardware
6809-based home computers
Computer companies of France
Thomson computers
Computer science education in France